Communauté d'agglomération du Grand Sénonais is the communauté d'agglomération, an intercommunal structure, centred on the town of Sens. It is located in the Yonne department, in the Bourgogne-Franche-Comté region, central France. Created in 2002, its seat is in Sens. Its area is 375.2 km2. Its population was 59,202 in 2019, of which 26,688 in Sens proper.

Composition
The communauté d'agglomération consists of the following 27 communes:

Armeau
Les Bordes
Collemiers
Courtois-sur-Yonne
Dixmont
Étigny
Fontaine-la-Gaillarde
Gron
Maillot
Malay-le-Grand
Malay-le-Petit
Marsangy
Noé
Paron
Passy
Rosoy
Rousson
Saint-Clément
Saint-Denis-lès-Sens
Saint-Martin-du-Tertre
Saligny
Sens
Soucy
Véron
Villeneuve-sur-Yonne
Villiers-Louis
Voisines

References

Sens
Sens